Potamonautes neumanni is a species of crustacean in the family Potamonautidae. It is endemic to Kenya.  Its natural habitat is rivers.

References

Endemic fauna of Kenya
Arthropods of Kenya
Freshwater crustaceans of Africa
Potamoidea
Taxa named by Franz Martin Hilgendorf
Crustaceans described in 1898
Taxonomy articles created by Polbot